Limestone Lake may refer to:

Limestone Lake (British Columbia)
Limestone Lake (Manitoba)

See also
 Lake Limestone, a lake in Texas